Vulturești is a commune located in Suceava County, Western Moldavia, Romania. It is composed of eight villages: Giurgești, Hreațca, Jacota, Merești, Osoi, Pleșești (the commune centre), Valea Glodului, and Vulturești.

The commune is situated in the southeastern part of Suceava County, on the banks of the river Șomuzul Mic. It borders Udești commune to the north, the town of Liteni to the east, Dolhești, Preutești, and Hârtop communes to the south, and Bunești and Bosanci communes to the west.

Natives 

 Constantin Costăchescu (1909–1983), submarine commander in the Romanian Navy during World War II

References

Communes in Suceava County
Localities in Western Moldavia